Becquigny is a commune in the Somme department in Hauts-de-France in northern France.

Geography
Becquigny is a small village on the left bank of the river Avre.

Population

History
 Archeological investigations have found Gallo-Roman traces in the village.
 The town, mentioned for the first time in 1119, was rebuilt after being destroyed in 1163.  It belonged to the Abbey of  Saint Corneille of Compiègne, and the Roye family were at sometime lords of the manor.
 As with many towns of the Somme, Becquigny underwent the ravages of World War I.

Places and monuments
 In the cemetery are the ruins of a magnificent chapel that once belonged to the Order of the Templars.  The 12th century gate is a fine example of Romanesque architecture.

See also
Communes of the Somme department

References

Communes of Somme (department)